These pontoon bridges are semi-permanent floating bridges located throughout the world. Four of the five longest floating bridges in the world are in Washington state.

Longest

The former Albert D. Rosellini Evergreen Point Bridge, at 7,578 feet (2,310 m), was the longest floating bridge in the world until the replacement bridge opened in 2016.

List

Australia
 Hobart Bridge
 Completed 1943. Spans 
 Spanned the Derwent River at Hobart, Tasmania
 Constructed of hollow concrete pontoons, it was replaced by a new bridge in 1964

Belarus

 Sozh Floating Bridge
 The new floating bridge replaced an older one and spanned the Sozh River at Korma, Belarus
 Built in 2003/2004, carries light automobile traffic.

Canada
 William R. Bennett Bridge in Kelowna, British Columbia
 Completed 2008. Spans .
 Spans Okanagan Lake in British Columbia, carrying Highway 97 from Kelowna to West Kelowna. Built to replace Okanagan Lake Bridge, which was the first floating bridge built in Canada. The old 3 lane floating bridge has been replaced by a new, 5 lane floating bridge. The old bridge — Okanagan Lake Bridge — was closed on May 31, 2008.

China
 Dongjin Bridge in Ganzhou, China
 Pontoon bridges have been constructed over the Zhang and Gong rivers since the Song Dynasty (960-1279).
 One of the bridges, the Dongjin Bridge, can still be seen.
 It is 400 metres long, made up of wooden planks placed on around 100 wooden boats linked together with iron chains.
 Guangji Bridge (Chaozhou), China

Curaçao

 Queen Emma Bridge
 A pontoon bridge from Punda to Otrabanda across the harbor of Willemstad on the island of Curaçao. Notable because this permanent bridge is hinged and opens regularly to enable the passage of oceangoing vessels.
 Span

Egypt
 Martyr Ahmed El-Mansy Floating Bridge
 A pontoon bridge in the Suez Canal in Ismailia to connect the west and east banks of the canal with two lanes of vehicular traffic and a pedestrian lane.
 Span

Guyana
 Berbice Bridge
 Completed 2008. Spans .
 Located near New Amsterdam in Guyana.
 Demerara Harbour Bridge
 Completed 1978. Spans .
 Located immediately south of Georgetown, Guyana, it is constructed with steel pontoon units and is the fourth longest floating bridge in the world.

India

 Howrah Bridge
 Completed 1874.
 Decommissioned 1943
 This bridge, connected Howrah and Calcutta on opposite banks of Hooghly River, was built using timber on pontoon and was opened to let river traffic through.

Norway
 Nordhordland Bridge
 Completed 1994. Spans  (the floating bridge part).
 Located near Bergen, Norway, the Nordhordland Bridge consists of a free-floating bridge and a high level cable-stayed bridge. The free-floating bridge has the longest laterally-unsupported span in the world. It is sometimes referred to as the Salhus Bridge.
 Architect's web site
 Bergøysund Floating Bridge
 Completed 1992. Spans .
 Located in Kristiansund, Norway.

Spain

 Puente de Barcas (Boat bridge),Seville
 Completed 1171, Spans 149 meters (488,8 ft).
 Moved 1845 for construct Puente de Isabel II
 Scrapped 1852

Turkey
 Galata Bridge
 Completed 1875. Spans .
 Decommissioned 1992.
 This floating bridge crossed the Golden Horn in Turkey. After it was damaged by a 1992 fire, it was towed up the Golden Horn to make way for the fifth and current Galata Bridge, a bascule bridge.

United Arab Emirates
 Floating Bridge, Dubai, United Arab Emirates
 A new floating bridge has been erected over Dubai Creek to ease traffic on over creek crossings in Dubai (United Arab Emirates)
 The bridge opened to the public on 16 July 2007; two weeks after applying the Salik road toll to the Al Garhoud Bridge.

United States

 Admiral Clarey Bridge
Pontoon bridge over the Arkansas River connecting Pope and Yell counties at Dardanelle, Arkansas.
Replacing a private ferry when it opened in 1891, the structure operated as a toll bridge. It was used until January 1929, when a free bridge of concrete and steel replaced it.
Over the years, it was washed away, in parts or completely, many times. 
 Governor Albert D. Rosellini Bridge — Evergreen Point
 Completed 1963. Spans .
 Formerly spanned Lake Washington in Washington State, carrying State Route 520 from Seattle to Medina. A toll bridge until 1979, its common name is the 520 bridge or Evergreen Point Floating Bridge. It was the longest floating bridge in the world until 2016.
 This bridge was removed in Spring, 2017.
 SR 520 Albert D. Rosellini Evergreen Point Floating Bridge (2016 bridge)
 Completed 2016. Spans .
 World's longest and widest floating bridge. Built to replace the 1963 bridge of the same name.
 Lacey V. Murrow Memorial Bridge
 Original bridge completed in 1940 but sank in 1990 because of weather and mishaps in maintenance.
 Second bridge completed 1993. Spans .
 Spans Lake Washington in Washington State, carrying Interstate 90 traffic eastbound from Seattle to Mercer Island. A toll bridge until 1946, its common name is the I-90 bridge or Lake Washington Floating Bridge. It was the first floating bridge longer than a mile, and at the time was the longest floating structure in the world. It is now the second longest floating bridge in the world.
 Hood Canal Bridge
 Completed 1961. Spans .
 Carries State Route 104 across Hood Canal in Washington state. It is the third longest floating bridge in the world.
 This bridge broke apart in the February 13, 1979 windstorm. It was rebuilt 3 years later.
 Homer M. Hadley Memorial Bridge
 Completed 1989. Spans .
 Spans Lake Washington in Washington state, carrying Interstate 90 traffic westbound from Mercer Island to Seattle. It runs parallel to the Lacey V. Murrow Memorial Bridge, which carries eastbound Interstate 90 Traffic, and is also commonly referred to as the I-90 bridge or Lake Washington Floating Bridge. It is the fifth longest floating bridge in the world.
 Eastbank Esplanade
 Completed 2001. Spans .
 Located in Portland, Oregon, it is the longest floating pedestrian bridge in the United States.
 Sunset Lake Floating Bridge
 Located in Brookfield, Vermont
 Built on logs in 1820, then upon tarred barrels in 1884, rebuilt using plastic barrels filled with styrofoam in 1978, carries light automobile traffic.  This bridge was closed to vehicle traffic spring of 2008.

References 

Bridges in China
Bridges in India
Bridges in Guyana
Bridges in Dubai
Bridges in Norway